A Million Ways to Die in the West is a 2014 American Western black comedy film directed by Seth MacFarlane and written by MacFarlane, Alec Sulkin and Wellesley Wild. The film features an ensemble cast including MacFarlane, Charlize Theron, Amanda Seyfried, Neil Patrick Harris, Giovanni Ribisi, Sarah Silverman, and Liam Neeson. The film follows a cowardly frontiersman who gains courage with the help of a female gunfighter and must use his newfound skills in a confrontation with her villainous outlaw husband.

Development for A Million Ways to Die in the West began while MacFarlane and co-writers Sulkin and Wild were watching western movies during the development of Ted. Casting was done between December 2012 and March 2013. Filming began on May 6, 2013, in various locations in New Mexico including Albuquerque and Santa Fe, and it concluded on August 9 that year. Joel McNeely composed the score.

The film was released on May 30, 2014, in the United States, and distributed worldwide by Universal Pictures. The film received mixed to negative reviews from critics, with criticism for its length, screenplay, humor and MacFarlane's performance and directing. It was released on DVD and Blu-ray on October 7, 2014, and earned more than $15 million in home media sales.

Plot

In 1882, in the town of Old Stump, Arizona, timid sheep farmer Albert Stark's girlfriend Louise breaks up with him because of his refusal to defend himself in a duel. He prepares to migrate to San Francisco, believing that the frontier offers nothing for him. Meanwhile, infamous outlaw Clinch Leatherwood shoots and kills an old prospector over a single gold nugget. He orders his right-hand man, Lewis, to escort his wife Anna to Old Stump while he continues his banditry.

Lewis and Anna arrive in Old Stump under the guise of two siblings intending to build a farm, but Lewis is arrested after shooting the pastor's son in a saloon fight. During the brawl, Albert saves Anna from being crushed to death, and the two become close friends. They attend a county fair where Louise's new boyfriend, the arrogant Foy, challenges Albert to a shooting contest. Albert loses, but Anna steps in and defeats Foy. Foy publicly humiliates Albert, who impulsively challenges Foy to a duel in a week's time to win back Louise. Anna then spends the week teaching Albert how to shoot.

During a barn dance the night before the duel, Anna gives Foy a Mickey. After leaving the dance, Albert and Anna kiss before heading home. After breaking out of jail and murdering the sheriff, Lewis observes the kiss and reports it to Clinch. On the day of the duel, Foy arrives late and gets diarrhea from the laxative he had unknowingly drunk. Albert, who has decided that Louise is not worth fighting for, forfeits anyway. He retires to the saloon, but Clinch arrives and reveals that Anna is his wife, threatening to kill more people unless his wife's lover duels him the next day. Later, Clinch confronts Anna by demanding that she reveal Albert's name and his whereabouts, or he will kill her. Before he attempts to rape her, she knocks him unconscious with a rock and escapes.

Anna returns to Albert's farm to warn him about Clinch, but he chastises her for lying to him. Clinch, having regained consciousness, tracks down Anna to the farm, but Albert helps her escape, then escapes himself. While fleeing, he is captured by a tribe of Apache Indians, who threaten to burn him alive. The Apaches spare him when he reveals that he can speak their language. They give him a bowl of peyote, which sends him flashing back to his birth and through painful events of his childhood before a vision of Anna makes him realize he loves her.

Meanwhile, Clinch recaptures Anna in town, but Albert returns to Old Stump and confronts him. He wounds Clinch with a bullet dipped in rattlesnake venom before his own gun is shot out of his hand but manages to stall until Clinch fatally succumbs to the poison. Louise attempts to win back Albert, but he rejects her and instead happily enters into a relationship with Anna, who becomes his new girlfriend. Albert also receives a bounty for killing Clinch and uses the money to buy more sheep.

In a pre-credits scene, the proprietor of the racist shooting game called "Runaway Slave" at the fair asks who would like to take a shot. This is the same game at which Foy had earlier defeated Albert and Anna had then defeated Foy. Django Freeman steps up and shoots the man dead.  He then says: "people die at the fair," which Albert had previously observed after a snake-oil salesman at the fair was gored by a runaway bull.  This echoes the running gag in the film as to all the dangers of the Old West.

Cast

 Seth MacFarlane as Albert Stark, a wimpy but kind-hearted sheepherder
 Mike Salazar as 6-year-old Albert
 Preston Bailey as 12-year-old Albert
 Charlize Theron as Anna Barnes-Leatherwood, Clinch Leatherwood's rebellious wife, who befriends Albert
 Amanda Seyfried as Louise, Albert's unappreciative ex-girlfriend
 Liam Neeson as Clinch Leatherwood, a notorious outlaw and Anna's abusive husband
 Giovanni Ribisi as Edward, a cobbler, Albert's best friend and Ruth's boyfriend
 Neil Patrick Harris as Foy, a rich, snobby Old Stump inhabitant and Louise's current boyfriend
 Sarah Silverman as Ruth, Edward's girlfriend and a prostitute
 Christopher Hagen as George Stark, Albert's abusive father
 Wes Studi as Chief Cochise, the leader of a band of Apache Indians
 Rex Linn as the Sheriff/Narrator
 Alex Borstein as Millie, a madam at the local brothel where Ruth works
 Ralph Garman as Dan
 John Aylward as Pastor Wilson
 Amick Byram as Marcus Thornton
 Evan Jones as Lewis, a ruthlessly violent gunman and Clinch Leatherwood's right-hand man
 Dylan Kenin as Pastor's Son, who is killed by Lewis in the bar
 Matt Clark as the Old Prospector, an unfortunate victim of Clinch's gang

Cameos

 Jamie Foxx as Django Freeman (uncredited), who shoots the owner of the "Runaway Slave" game. The scene was added after test audiences reacted poorly to the shooting gallery's cartoon black slaves as targets.
 Ryan Reynolds (uncredited) as a man Clinch kills in the saloon
 Tait Fletcher as Cowboy #1
 Gilbert Gottfried as Abraham Lincoln, seen during Albert's drug trip.
 Mike Henry as smiling man in photograph
 Dennis Haskins as a snake oil salesman
 John Michael Higgins as Dandy #1
 Christopher Lloyd as Doc Brown, whom Albert stumbles upon working on the DeLorean time machine
 Bill Maher as a traveling comedian
 Ewan McGregor as a cowboy who mocks Albert at the fair
 Alec Sulkin as guy at fair
 Rupert Boneham as guy in bar fight
 Kaley Cuoco (uncredited, unrated version only) as a woman that Albert tries to pick up in a store
 Patrick Stewart (uncredited voice) as a long-legged sheep seen during Albert's drug trip
 Mae Whitman as Prostitute

Production

Development
A Million Ways to Die in the West originated as an inside joke between MacFarlane and co-writers Sulkin and Wild, while they were watching Hang 'Em High (1968). The joke evolved into "riffing on the idea of how dull, depressing, and dangerous it must have been to live in the Wild West." MacFarlane, a lifelong fan of westerns, began researching the topic, using Jeff Guinn's nonfiction novel, The Last Gunfight: The Real Story of the Shootout at the O.K. Corral—And How It Changed the American West as an "invaluable resource," and basis for many of the ways of dying in the film. Various aspects of the film were inspired by western films. The decision to make Albert a sheepherder was inspired by Montana (1950) and his average, non-confrontational demeanor by 3:10 to Yuma (1957). Other westerns that inspired MacFarlane and the crew during writing included Oklahoma! (1955), The Man Who Shot Liberty Valance (1962), and El Dorado (1966). The film was first announced on December 3, 2012, marking MacFarlane's second foray into live-action directing, after 2012's Ted. Tippett Studio was hired to work on the film's visual effects.

Casting
On January 30, 2013, it was announced that Charlize Theron had joined the film. Theron later revealed that she "begged" for her role, as she wanted the opportunity to work in comedy. On February 11, it was announced Amanda Seyfried had joined the film. On March 6, it was announced Liam Neeson and Giovanni Ribisi had joined the film. Neeson, who nearly always suppresses his Irish accent when acting, agreed to play the part of Clinch only on the condition that he could use his Irish accent. In an interview on The Tonight Show Starring Jimmy Fallon, Neeson remarked that he made this demand because an episode of MacFarlane's Family Guy had previously made a joke out of the juxtaposition of Neeson playing a cowboy with an Irish accent.
On March 18, it was announced that Sarah Silverman was cast to play a prostitute in the film. On May 10, it was announced that the film would be co-financed by Media Rights Capital and Fuzzy Door Productions, along with Bluegrass Films and distributed by Universal Studios. On May 11, 2013, it was announced that Neil Patrick Harris had joined the film. On May 29, 2013, MacFarlane announced that Bill Maher had joined the cast. On February 21, 2014, he announced that Gilbert Gottfried had also joined the cast.

Filming
Principal photography began on May 6, 2013. Filming locations included various areas in and around Albuquerque, New Mexico, also including the Santa Fe Studio in Santa Fe. Principal photography ended on August 9, 2013. The film shoot was difficult, as the cast and crew navigated rough weather: "everything from hailstorms to blistering heat to arctic winds and torrential rainstorms."

Soundtrack

The score was composed by Joel McNeely. The soundtrack was released by Back Lot Music on May 27, 2014. The theme song "A Million Ways to Die" is performed by Alan Jackson. It was released as a single on April 29, 2014. A portion of the Back to the Future theme by Alan Silvestri is used during Christopher Lloyd's cameo. Near the end of the movie, the refrain of "Tarzan Boy" by Baltimora is used as a fictional "Muslim Death Chant."

 Track listing

Release
On May 16, 2014, the film had its world premiere at the Regency Village Theater in Los Angeles. The film was later released nationwide on May 30, 2014. The film was produced by Media Rights Capital, Fuzzy Door Productions, and Bluegrass Films and distributed by Universal Pictures.

Marketing
On January 27, 2014, MacFarlane announced that he wrote a companion novel based on the film's script, which was released on March 4, 2014. An audio-book version was also made available, narrated by Jonathan Frakes. MacFarlane wrote the book on weekends during shooting for the film, partially due to boredom.

Box office
A Million Ways to Die in the West grossed $43.1 million in North America and $43.3 million in other territories, for a worldwide total of $86.4 million, against its $40 million budget.

The film grossed $16.8 million in its opening weekend, finishing in third place at the box office behind fellow newcomer Maleficent and the previous weekend's opener X-Men: Days of Future Past. This was below expectations of $26 million. In its second weekend, the film dropped to number five, grossing an additional $7.3 million. In its third weekend, the film dropped to number eight, grossing $3.2 million. In its fourth weekend, the film dropped to number 11, grossing $1.6 million.

Home media
A Million Ways to Die in the West was released via DVD and Blu-ray on October 7, 2014. The Blu-ray release contains an unrated version (135 minutes), along with the original theatrical cut (116 minutes). In the United States, the film has grossed $8,336,420 from DVD sales and $6,739,162 from Blu-ray sales, making a total of $15,075,582.

Reception

Critical response
A Million Ways to Die in the West received mixed to negative reviews from critics. Review aggregation website Rotten Tomatoes gave the film a 33% rating based on 211 reviews, with an average score of 4.90/10. The site's consensus states, "While it offers a few laughs and boasts a talented cast, Seth MacFarlane's overlong, aimless A Million Ways to Die in the West is a disappointingly scattershot affair." Another review aggregation website, Metacritic, gave a score of 44 out of 100, based on reviews from 43 critics, indicating "mixed or average reviews". Audiences surveyed by CinemaScore gave the film an average grade of "B" on an A+ to F scale; opening weekend demographics were 55% male and 72% over 25 years of age.

Claudia Puig's review in USA Today was largely positive, writing, "A Western with a contemporary sensibility and dialogue that sounds markedly modern, A Million Ways to Die in the West is quintessential MacFarlane, at once silly and witty, juvenile and clever." Stephen Holden's review in The New York Times was mainly neutral, calling the film "a live-action spinoff of Family Guy, with different characters." "While the whole thing feels weirdly miscalculated to me, A Million Ways to Die in the West tweaks the formula just enough, delivers a few laughs and keeps the guest stars coming," wrote Salon columnist Andrew O'Hehir. Rafer Guzman of Newsday found the film amusing, calling it "another example of MacFarlane's ability to mix poop jokes with romance, foul language with sweet sentiment, offensive humor with boyish charm."

Scott Mendelson of Forbes commended MacFarlane's decision to make an unconventional western comedy, but summarized the film as "just ambitious enough for that to be genuinely disappointing." Michael O'Sullivan at The Washington Post was mixed, deeming the film a "broad, wildly hit-or-miss satire," remarking that he found few of the jokes in the film funny. "Spiritually, it's closer to a mid-range crowd-pleaser such as City Slickers than Blazing Saddles, too enamoured of genre convention to reach for the comic dynamite," wrote Mike McCahill at The Guardian.

Michael Phillips of the Chicago Tribune criticized MacFarlane's acting and direction as: "A failure of craft. He can't direct action, or even handle scenery well. He can't set up a visual joke properly without resorting to head-butting and bone-crunching, and he doesn't know how, or when, to move his camera. He's not good enough as a romantic lead to anchor a picture." Richard Corliss of Time called the film a "sagebrush comedy whose visual grandeur and appealing actors get polluted by some astonishingly lazy writing." Scott Foundas of Variety found the film "overlong and uninspired," criticizing the film's "lazy writing," and MacFarlane's "surprisingly bland" comic performance.

Rene Rodriguez of the Miami Herald gave the film one star, commenting, "There are enough laughs scattered throughout A Million Ways to Die in the West that while you're watching it, the movie seems like a passable comedy. By the time you get home, though, you can barely remember the jokes." John DeFore of The Hollywood Reporter criticized the film's running time: "Though the film is hardly laugh-free, its uneven jokes appear to have breezed through a very forgiving editing process." Joe Morgenstern of The Wall Street Journal too found the film's length "exhausting," noting, "Some of it sputters, settling for smiles instead of laughs, and much of it flounders while the slapdash script searches [...] for ever more common denominators in toilet humor."

Accolades

References

External links

 A Million Ways to Die in the West at Universal Studios website
 
 
 
 

2014 films
2010s Western (genre) comedy films
American Western (genre) comedy films
American satirical films
Django films
2010s English-language films
Films directed by Seth MacFarlane
Films set in Arizona
Films set in 1882
Films set on farms
Films shot in New Mexico
Fuzzy Door Productions films
Media Rights Capital films
Universal Pictures films
Films scored by Joel McNeely
Films produced by Scott Stuber
American slapstick comedy films
2014 comedy films
Films with screenplays by Seth MacFarlane
Films produced by Seth MacFarlane
Films about death
American romantic comedy films
2010s American films